Dunlop may refer to:

Companies
 Name derived from John Boyd Dunlop (1840–1921)
 Dunlop Rubber, manufacturer of tyre and rubber products from 1889 to 1985
 Dunlop Tyres, manufacturer of tyres since 1985
 Dunlop Sport, a brand of sporting goods
 Dunlop Sport (Australia)
 For other companies with the Dunlop name, see Dunlop (brands)
 Dunlop Manufacturing, also known as "Jim Dunlop", a music supplies company
 Dunlop Standard Aerospace Group (currently, "Standard Aero")

Places
 Dunlop, Australian Capital Territory, a suburb of Canberra, Australia
 Dunlop, East Ayrshire, a Scottish village
 Fort Dunlop, in Birmingham, England, once the main factory and head office of Dunlop Rubber
 Dunlop, Kolkata, neighbourhood in Baranagar, Kolkata
 Sahaganj, base of Dunlop India

People
 Dunlop (surname)

Other
 Dunlop valve, a valve stem still widely used on bicycle tires in many countries 
 Dunlop cheese, made in Scotland

See also
Dunlap (disambiguation)